George Alevisatos (born August 25, 1938) is a former Canadian football defensive lineman who played for the Montreal Alouettes and the Hamilton Tiger-Cats of the Canadian Football League. In 1960 and 1962, Alevisatos played in seven regular season games in the CFL.

References 

1938 births
Living people
Canadian football defensive linemen
Concordia Stingers football players
Montreal Alouettes players
Hamilton Tiger-Cats players
Players of Canadian football from Quebec
Canadian football people from Montreal